The Juno Awards of 2015 honoured Canadian music industry achievements in the latter part of 2013 and in most of 2014. The awards were presented in Hamilton, Ontario, Canada during the weekend of 14–15 March 2015. The main ceremony was conducted at FirstOntario Centre and televised on CTV. Various concerts and events related to the awards began on 9 March 2015. This marked the sixth time that the awards were presented in Hamilton, which last hosted the Junos in 2001.

Events
The main ceremony was hosted by Hedley lead singer Jacob Hoggard. Performers include:

 Arkells
 deadmau5
 Hedley
 Kiesza
 Lights
 Magic!
 Shawn Mendes
 Alanis Morissette
 Sam Roberts Band
 The Weeknd

CTV's broadcast and later rebroadcast of the main awards ceremony attracted a total television audience of 1.6 million, based on next-day ratings from Numeris.

The Juno Cup charity ice hockey game between musicians and NHL players was held at the Dave Andreychuk Mountain Arena & Skating Centre on 13 March 2015.

Nominees and winners
Alanis Morissette is the 2015 inductee into the Canadian Music Hall of Fame. Rush is the year's recipient of the Allan Waters Humanitarian Award. The Walt Grealis Special Achievement Award recipient is Ray Danniels of Anthem Records (Rush) and SRO Management.

Nominees were announced on 27 January 2015.

People

Albums

Songs and recordings

Other

References

2015 music awards
2015
Music festivals in Ontario
Culture of Hamilton, Ontario
2015 in Canadian music
March 2015 events in Canada
2015 in Ontario